is a passenger railway station in located in the town of Kawagoe, Mie District, Mie Prefecture, Japan, operated by the private railway operator Kintetsu Railway.

Lines
Kawagoe Tomisuhara Station is served by the Nagoya Line, and is located 30.0 rail kilometers from the starting point of the line at Kintetsu Nagoya Station.

Station layout
The station consists of two island platforms serving four lines connected by a footbridge.

Platforms

Adjacent stations

History
The Ise Railway became the Sangu Express Electric Railway's Ise Line on September 15, 1936, and was renamed the Nagoya Line on December 7, 1938. After merging with Osaka Electric Kido on March 15, 1941, the line became the Kansai Express Railway's Nagoya Line. This line was merged with the Nankai Electric Railway on June 1, 1944 to form Kintetsu. As a part of the development project around the station and in compliance with the request by the Kawagoe town government, it was renamed on March 20, 2009, the day of the opening of the Hanshin Railway Hanshin Namba Line.

Passenger statistics
In fiscal 2019, the station was used by an average of 3615 passengers daily (boarding passengers only).

Surrounding area
Kawagoe Power Station
Mie Prefectural Kawagoe High School
Yokkaichi City Tomisuhara Junior High School
Yokkaichi City Tomisuhara Elementary School

See also
List of railway stations in Japan

References

External links

 Kintetsu: Kawagoe Tomisuhara Station

Railway stations in Japan opened in 1929
Railway stations in Mie Prefecture
Stations of Kintetsu Railway
Kawagoe, Mie